Seasons of Love is the third album by Christian rock band Mad at the World. Released in 1990, it was their highest charting album.

History
Beginning with their third disc, Seasons of Love, and in order to have a sound more amiable for live performances, the band's musical style shifted away from synthpop toward hard rock. Seasons of Love, released in 1990 and the first disc to feature Brent Gordon on guitar, was the band's highest charting album. The band's switch to hard rock was jarring for some people. It features some very aggressive and energetic songs, including "Promised Land" and "So Insane", both of which deal with drug abuse. The album in general had the band being compared to The Cult, Danzig and The Cure.

This album was reissued by KMG Records in 1999 on a "two-for-one" disc with Mad at the World.

Track listing
All songs written by Roger Rose, except "Marshmallow Land" written by Randy Rose.
 "The Narrow Road" – 3:88
 "Seasons of Love" – 4:51
 "City of Anger" – 5:34
 "When the Wind Blows" – 5:38
 "Marshmallow Land" – 2:58
 "Summer's Gone" – 3:06
 "Promised Land (The Deception of Drugs)" – 5:24
 "So Insane" – 3:22
 "It's Not a Joke" – 3:27
 "The Love That Never Fades" – 4:05
 "Seasons of Love (Reprise)" – 5:04

Personnel
Roger Rose – vocals, guitars, keyboards, drums, tambourine
Randy Rose – vocals, drums
Mike Pendleton – electric bass, guitar
Brent Gordon – lead and rhythm guitar

Chart position
This album reached #18 on the Billboard Top Contemporary Christian chart.

Video
No videos were filmed for this album, although a live performance of "Marshmallow Land" from 1995 is available on the band's website. This performance was filmed after Mike Pendleton and Brent Gordon left the band, and features Mike Link and Ben Jacobs.

References

1990 albums
Mad at the World albums